Pieter ("Piet") Wildschut (born 25 October 1957) is a Dutch former professional footballer who played as a defender. He obtained 11 international caps for the Netherlands national team.

Career
Wildschut was born in Leeuwarden, Friesland. After starting his career for FC Groningen, he represented his native country at the 1978 FIFA World Cup, where Holland finished runners-up, as a player of FC Twente. Later on Wildschut moved to PSV Eindhoven. He studied Mathematics at Eindhoven University of Technology. After his soccer career, Wildschut and his family moved to the United States where he runs a software company.

References

External links

  Profile
  Profile
  Profile
  FC Groningen Profile
 Dutch career stats – Voetbal International
 Antwerp career stats – FC Antwerp

1957 births
Living people
Footballers from Leeuwarden
Association football defenders
Dutch footballers
Netherlands international footballers
1978 FIFA World Cup players
FC Groningen players
FC Twente players
PSV Eindhoven players
Royal Antwerp F.C. players
Roda JC Kerkrade players
Dutch expatriate footballers
Expatriate footballers in Belgium
Dutch expatriate sportspeople in Belgium
Eredivisie players
Belgian Pro League players
Eindhoven University of Technology alumni
Dutch emigrants to the United States